Academician Ivan Ivanovich Shirokogorov (1869–1946) was a pathologist. Full member and one of the founders of Azerbaijan Academy of Sciences (1945). Full member of the USSR Academy of Medical Sciences (1944). Rector of Azerbaijan State University (1920–1921) and the first dean of Medical
Faculty (1919–1928). Honored scientist of Azerbaijan Republic (1936).

References

Azerbaijani pathologists
1869 births
1946 deaths
Soviet pathologists
Academicians of the USSR Academy of Medical Sciences